Jean-Christophe Rufin (born 28 June 1952)  is a French doctor, diplomat, historian, globetrotter and novelist. He is the president of Action Against Hunger, one of the earliest members of Médecins Sans Frontières, and a member of the Académie française.

Private and public life

Early life
Rufin was born in Bourges, Cher in 1952. An only child, he was raised by his grandparents as his father had left the family and his mother worked in Paris. His grandfather, a doctor and member of the French Resistance during World War II had been imprisoned for two years at Buchenwald.

In 1977, after medical school, Rufin went to Tunisia as a volunteer doctor. He led his first humanitarian mission in Eritrea, where he met Azeb, who became his second wife.

Career

Human rights activism
A graduate of the Institut d'études politiques de Paris (Sciences-Po), in 1986 he became advisor to the Secretary of State for Human Rights and published his first book, Le Piège humanitaire (The Humanitarian Trap), an essay on the political stakes of humanitarian action.

As a doctor, he is one of the pioneers of humanitarian movement "without borders," for which he has led numerous missions in eastern Africa and Latin America. A former vice-president of Médecins Sans Frontières and former president of the non-governmental organization Action Against Hunger.

Dr. Jean-Christophe Rufin was appointed President of the Sanofi Espoir Corporate Foundation on September 18, 2020.

Report on racism and anti-Semitism
In 2003, Rufin was commissioned by French Interior Minister Dominique de Villepin to write an in-depth report on the upsurge of anti-Semitism in France.  He presented the final report  on October 19, 2004.

The "Rufin report" (as it later became known), as described by the US State Department, concluded the following:
 Racism and anti-Semitism were a threat to French democracy.
 Anti-semitic acts are not only carried out by elements of the extreme right and youths of North African descent, but also by "disaffected individuals" whose anti-Semitic obsessions prompt their attacks against Jews and Jewish institutions.
 Radical anti-Zionists who question Israel's right to exist were dangerous.

The report, as described by the US State Department, recommended the following actions:
 That a law be created to punish those publicly equating Israel with apartheid or Nazi Germany.
 That the French press law of 1881, designed to guarantee freedom of the press, is too unwieldy to adequately address the issues of racism.
 That intolerance be countered in primary schools and by the education of new immigrants about the fight against racism and anti-Semitism.
 That an observation system to monitor racist and anti-Semitic websites be created and that it work closely with authorities to prosecute offenders.

The report was criticised by Michel Tubiana of the Ligue des droits de l'homme, who accused Rufin of "acting like an arsonist fireman."  Tubiana said that the focus on anti-Semitism created an "imbalance" in the approach to fighting all racism, and that if the recommendation became law, the umbrella group of the International Federation for Human Rights would be punished because it viewed Israel's treatment of Israeli Arabs as "discriminatory".

Selected bibliography

Essays
 L'aventure humanitaire ("The Humanitarian Adventure"), coll. "Découvertes Gallimard" (nº 226) (1994)
 La dictature libérale ("The Liberal Dictatorship") (1994)
 L'empire et les nouveaux barbares ("The Empire and the New Barbarians") (1991)
 Le piège humanitaire : quand l'humanitaire remplace la guerre ("The Humane Trap: when humanitarianism replaces war")  (1986)

Novels
1997 The Abyssinian (1997) - winner of Prix Goncourt du Premier Roman and Prix Méditerranée 
1998 The Siege of Isfahan 
1999 Lost Causes / "Asmara et les causes perdues" (1999) - winner of prix Interallié 
2001 Brazil Red (Rouge Brésil; 2001) - winner of prix Goncourt
2004 Globalia
2007 Le Parfum d'Adam
2010 Katiba 
2011 Sept histoires qui reviennent de loin  
2012 Le Grand Cœur
2014 The Red Collar (Le Collier rouge) - winner of prix Maurice Genevoix
2015 Check-point
2016 The Santiago Pilgrimage

Non-fiction books
 Économie des guerres civiles ("Economics of Civil Wars"), with Jean François (1996) 
 Mondes rebelles ("World Rebels"), with Arnaud de La Grange and Jean-Marc Balancie. (1996)

References

External links
 Jean-Christophe Rufin: Writing without borders, Profile in Paris Voice, accessed June 26, 2006.
 Books and reviews: "Économie des guerres civiles", François Grunewald, International Review of the Red Cross, December 31, 1997, accessed June 26, 2006.

1952 births
Living people
Writers from Bourges
French humanitarians
20th-century French physicians
20th-century French novelists
21st-century French novelists
French medical writers
French travel writers
French historical novelists
Postmodern writers
Prix Goncourt winners
Prix Interallié winners
Joseph Kessel Prize recipients
Prix Goncourt du Premier Roman recipients
Members of the Académie Française
Ambassadors of France to Senegal
Ambassadors of France to the Gambia
French male novelists
20th-century French male writers
21st-century French male writers
French male non-fiction writers
Chevaliers of the Ordre des Arts et des Lettres
Officiers of the Légion d'honneur
Recipients of orders, decorations, and medals of Senegal